is a Japanese former butterfly swimmer. He competed in the men's 200 metre butterfly at the 1964 Summer Olympics.

References

External links
 

1943 births
Living people
Japanese male butterfly swimmers
Olympic swimmers of Japan
Swimmers at the 1964 Summer Olympics
Place of birth missing (living people)
20th-century Japanese people